Echinolittorina parcipicta is a species of sea snail, a marine gastropod mollusk in the family Littorinidae, the winkles or periwinkles.

Description

Distribution

References

 Reid D.G. (2002). The genus Nodilittorina von Martens, 1897 (Gastropoda: Littorinidae) in the Eastern Pacific Ocean, with a discussion of biogeographic provinces of the rocky-shore fauna. The Veliger 45(2): 85–170
 Williams S.T. & Reid D.G. (2004). Speciation and diversity on tropical rocky shores: a global phylogeny of snails of the genus Echinolittorina. Evolution 58(10): 2227–2251

External links

Littorinidae
Gastropods described in 1864